Coeliopsidinae is an orchid subtribe in the tribe Cymbidieae. The three members of this subtribe have traditionally been lumped in with Stanhopeinae, but obvious morphological traits and new molecular analysis by Whitten et al. in 2000 confirmed the group reclassified by Szlachetko (1995).

These genera have smooth, unribbed, ovoid pseudobulbs with 3-4 large and thin plicate leaves. The inflorescences are thick and bear globose flowers with thick, fleshy sepals and petals, presence of a column foot and mentum. Roots have prominent root hairs.

Most distinct is the viscidia that are button-shaped and sclerified with short stipes. The three genera all have elongated Maxillaria-type dust seeds and not Stanhopea-type balloon seeds.

Like Stanhopeinae the members of this group are pollinated by male euglossine bees. The sticky viscidia of this group are adapted to attachment on the smooth surface of the scutum of the male bees. (Peristeria elata, the pollinia attaches to the bee's head; in Coeliopsis, on the frons of the bee's head; Williams, 1982.)

Stanhopeinae and Coeliopsidinae are now considered closely related sister subtribes.

Genera
Coeliopsis
Lycomormium
Peristeria

References
 

 
Orchid subtribes